Acworth is a city in Cobb County, Georgia, United States. It is part of the Atlanta metropolitan area. The 2019 estimate for Acworth's population is 22,818. As of the 2010 census, this city had a population of 20,425, up from 13,422 in 2000. Acworth is located in the foothills of the North Georgia mountains along the southeastern banks of Lake Acworth and Lake Allatoona on the Etowah River. Unincorporated areas known as Acworth extend into Bartow, Cherokee and Paulding counties.

Acworth's is often referred to as "the Lake City" because of its proximity to Lake Allatoona and Lake Acworth.

History
Like the rest of Cobb County, the area now containing Acworth was carved out of the former Cherokee Nation in 1831 after the natives were expelled.

The Western and Atlantic Railroad was completed through town in 1840. A watering station for the locomotives was established there.

The town received its current name in 1843 from Western & Atlantic Railroad engineer Joseph L. Gregg, who named it for his hometown of Acworth, New Hampshire, which was named for the former Royal Navy Surveyor Sir Jacob Acworth.

Telegraph lines reached the town in 1851.

A private school was opened for white students in 1852. A newer private school operated from 1899 to 1935, when they integrated with the Cobb County School District. Until 1935, high school students from Acworth paid tuition to attend. Students outside the town were subsidized by the Cobb County School Board. Black students were educated separately in a grammar school. The closest Black high school was in Atlanta. Later, students were bused by the county to a segregated school in Marietta.

Acworth was incorporated on December 1, 1860.

Volunteers to fight in the Civil War enlisted in what became Company A ("Acworth Infantry") in the 18th Georgia Volunteer Infantry and Company C ("Invincibles") in the 41st Georgia Volunteer Infantry.

The town was captured by the Union June 6, 1864. The city was called "Little Shanty" by the Union troops, to contrast it with the next town south, "Big Shanty", since renamed Kennesaw. The town was under martial law during the six months of occupation. On November 13, 1864, the town was burned down by the army of General W. T. Sherman, sparing 12 homes and one church; its citizens were left destitute.

The town had nearly recovered by the 1880s. Cotton farming in the area peaked from the 1890s through the 1920s. Low prices during the Great Depression resulted in a cessation of cotton farming in the area and throughout Cobb County.

During segregation, the railroad tracks served as a racial divide, with African Americans living to the northeast of the tracks and the whites to the southwest. There were few common public events. When a movie theater was erected in the 1930s, Blacks were allowed to access the balcony from a separate entrance. Whites sat on the main floor.

Volunteers formed a fire department in 1907.

There were eventually a total of three textile mills in town from 1905 through the 1980s. They employed about 800 workers at their peak.

In 1926, Main Street was paved. When the entire Dixie Highway (old U.S. Route 41 and part of the Cherokee Peachtree Trail) was paved in 1929, over 800 tourist vehicles entered the city daily.

When the Etowah River was dammed, forming Lake Allatoona, citizens feared that land near the town would become a swamp. They successfully petitioned for a second dam, resulting in Lake Acworth in the 1950s. This became a tourist attraction.

The town made a major improvement in its water and sewage lines in the late 1940s.

The city elected its first woman mayor, Mary McCall, in 1956 and 1961–66.

African-American students were schooled separately from white children until 1967.

Acworth was recognized as a 2010 All-America City Award winner by the National Civic League.

In 2011, the filming of several scenes for the Footloose remake took place in downtown Acworth. The Acworth Presbyterian Church was used as the primary church, and the house of Mayor Tommy Allegood was used as Julianne Hough's character's home.

In 2017, the city was the site of the WWA Wakeboarding National Championship.

Geography
Acworth is located in the foothills of the North Georgia mountains along the southeastern banks of Lake Acworth and Lake Allatoona on the Etowah River. It is bordered by the city of Kennesaw to the southeast and by Bartow and Cherokee counties to the north.

Interstate 75 runs through the northern part of the city in Cherokee and Bartow counties, with access from exits 277 and 278. U.S. Route 41 and Georgia State Route 92 also run through the city, with GA-92 leading east  to Woodstock, and south  to Hiram. US-41 runs to the west of the city, leading southeast  to Kennesaw, Georgia and northwest  to Cartersville.

Unincorporated areas considered Acworth for mailing purposes extend into southeast Bartow County, southwest Cherokee County, and northeast Paulding County. Some of the incorporated portions of Acworth east of Nance Road and Acworth Due West Road have a Kennesaw mailing address.

Transportation

Major roads
The main route through the center of Acworth is Main Street, a two-lane road. It is known as "Old 41" as it was formerly the route for US 41. State Route 92 and the new Highway 41 pass through the southern part of the city. The newly built Seven Hills Connector connects South Acworth to Paulding County. Bells Ferry Road goes through Acworth, Kennesaw, Marietta, and Woodstock.

Pedestrians and cycling

 Acworth Trail
 Graves Path

Demographics

2020 census

As of the 2020 United States census, there were 22,440 people, 8,337 households, and 5,470 families residing in the city.

2000 census
As of the census of 2000, there were 13,422 people, 5,194 households, and 3,589 families residing in the city. The racial makeup of the city was 79.7% White, 12.6% African American, 0.2% Native American, 2.3% Asian, 0.02% Pacific Islander, 3.2% from other races, and 2.00% from two or more races. Hispanic or Latino of any race were 6.05% of the population.

There were 5,194 households, out of which 37.7% had children under the age of 18 living with them, 54.9% were married couples living together, 10.8% had a female householder with no husband present, and 30.9% were non-families. 23.5% of all households were made up of individuals, and 5.4% had someone living alone who was 65 years of age or older. The average household size was 2.58 and the average family size was 3.08.

In the city, the population was spread out, with 27.0% under the age of 18, 9.0% from 18 to 24, 41.0% from 25 to 44, 15.7% from 45 to 64, and 7.2% who were 65 years of age or older. The median age was 31 years. For every 100 females, there were 95.4 males. For every 100 females age 18 and over, there were 92.6 males.

Government
The city is governed by a five-member Board of Aldermen, who serve staggered four-year terms. The mayor is elected to four-year terms.

An unusual ordinance once required all citizens to own a rake. This ordinance was enacted shortly after the neighboring city of Kennesaw, Georgia ordered every homeowner to own a gun in 1982. The requirement to own a rake is no longer in effect.

The city maintains ten public parks: Acworth Sports Complex, Baker Plantation, Dallas Landing, East Lakeshore, Frana Brown, Logan Farm, Newberry, Overlook, Proctor Landing, and South Shore.

Education
Public education in Acworth is handled by the Cobb County School District.

Public schools include:
Acworth Elementary School
Baker Elementary School 
Ford Elementary School 
Frey Elementary School 
Pickett's Mill Elementary School 
Pitner Elementary School 
Barber Middle School
Durham Middle School 
Allatoona High School
North Cobb High School
Private schools include:
North Cobb Christian School
Sunbrook Academy at Governors Towne Club

Notable people 
 Johnny Archer, professional pool player and Billiard Congress of America Hall of Fame inductee
 Jason Bohn, professional golfer
 Angie Bowie, former actress/model and ex-wife of David Bowie
 Warren Creavalle, professional soccer player
 Robby Ginepri, former professional tennis player
 Grant Henry, artist and businessman
 Scotti Madison, former professional baseball player
 Jordan Matthews, soccer player
 Larry Nelson, former professional golfer and World Golf Hall of Fame inductee
 Bronson Rechsteiner, professional wrestler
 Bobby Reynolds, former professional tennis player and current Auburn Tigers tennis coach
 Ranger Ross, former professional wrestler
 Clarke Schmidt, professional baseball player
 Musa Smith, former NFL running back
 Rick Steiner, former professional wrestler
 Scott Steiner, former professional wrestler
 Darren Waller, NFL tight end
 Raleigh Webb, NFL player on the New England Patriots 
 Aiden Zhane, RuPaul's Drag Race Season 12 contestant

References

External links

City of Acworth official website
City of Acworth official tourism website
Acworth, Georgia Photographs and Clippings, 1840-2018 from the Save Acworth History Foundation collection, Kennesaw State University Archives.

Cities in the Atlanta metropolitan area
Cities in Georgia (U.S. state)
Cities in Cobb County, Georgia